Cutty may refer to:

People
 Cutty Cutshall, American jazz trombonist Robert Cutshall (1911–1968)
 Cutty Ranks, Jamaican dancehall musician Philip Thomas (born 1965)
 Cutty (rapper), a rapper featured on T.O.K.'s Bombrush Hour

Other uses
 Cutty grass, a common name for several grasses
 Dennis "Cutty" Wise, a fictional character on the HBO drama The Wire

See also
 Cuddy (disambiguation)
 Cuttie stool, an inexpensive Scottish stool used in milking, and also for church penance
 Cutty Sark (disambiguation)